The Hoffman Automobile and Manufacturing Company was founded in 1900 by French immigrant Louis Hoffman and based in Cleveland, Ohio.  The first cars went on sale in 1902. The original versions ran on steam, but the business eventually accepted the internal combustion engine. Hoffman departed the company in 1903.

It was later renamed the Royal Motor Company.

Surviving examples
An open-top 1903 Hoffman is on display at the Crawford Auto-Aviation Museum. One of 100 Hoffmans made that year, it sported a single-cylinder gasoline engine and sold for $925 in 1903.

External links
Exhibit at Crawford Museum

References 

Brass Era vehicles
Manufacturing companies based in Cleveland
Motor vehicle manufacturers based in Ohio
Defunct motor vehicle manufacturers of the United States
Defunct manufacturing companies based in Ohio